The following is a list of notable alumni, non-graduates, lecturers, professors and administrators affiliated with Chulalongkorn University

Royalty and nobility

Public Servants

Art, architecture, and engineering

Law and politics

Literature

Film, theater, and television

Science, technology, medicine, and mathematics

Faculty 
Professors who are also Chulalongkorn alumni are listed in italics.

Notes

References 

Chulalongkorn University people
Chulalongkorn